Star Trak was an American record label, founded by The Neptunes and Rob Walker in 2001. It operated as a division of Interscope Geffen A&M, a subsidiary of Universal Music Group. Its name is a reference to the 1960s TV program Star Trek.

History

Beginnings
Star Trak was formed in 2001 by The Neptunes. The label was partially funded by Arista Records (from Sony Music Entertainment) in a joint-venture. Pharrell Williams would sign longtime friends, Clipse. Their debut album, Lord Willin', was released in 2002 led by the hits, "Grindin'", "When the Last Time", and "Ma, I Don't Love Her" After the success of the album, the label would sign Kelis, Vanessa Marquez, Fam-Lay, N.E.R.D and pop rock band Spymob, who provided backing instruments for N.E.R.D's debut album In Search Of.... The label released a compilation album during the summer of 2003, entitled, The Neptunes Present... Clones. In late 2003, Star Trak Entertainment released the highly successful album, Tasty, by Kelis led by the hit single "Milkshake." In early 2004, Star Trak linked with EMI's Virgin Records for a new distribution deal. The first release from this deal was Fly or Die by N.E.R.D.

Addition of Snoop Dogg
In mid-2004, Star Trak signed EMI cousin label, Doggystyle Records to a distribution deal and soared to new heights behind veteran Doggystyle Records rapper, Snoop Dogg. A few months later, Star Trak Entertainment left EMI's Virgin Records before completing a year with the label. They ended up moving operations over to Geffen Records and Interscope Records. Here, they would release Snoop Dogg's album, R&G (Rhythm & Gangsta): The Masterpiece. The album was led by "Drop It Like Its Hot", which would be yet another hit single for the fledgling label. This album would go Platinum in the US like some other Star Trak Entertainment releases. It also had many other hit singles. After the album's release, the label was in a surplus and could afford to spend money on new things, so they signed underground Houston, Texas rapper Slim Thug & in 2005, he released his debut album, Already Platinum. This album would give Star Trak Entertainment yet another hit, "Like A Boss", and "I Ain't Heard of That."

Decline
After the release of Slim Thug's album, Geffen Records was partially absorbed into Interscope, which moved Star Trak into an exclusive distribution deal with Interscope and ended all business with Geffen as Snoop Dogg stayed and took his Doggy Style imprint with him. During this time, the label added Kenna and Robin Thicke to their roster.

Resurgence
In 2006, Pharrell released his debut solo album, In My Mind. The album provided another two hits for the label and capitalized what is the Neptunes sound. These singles were "Can I Have It Like That", with Gwen Stefani, and "Number One", with Kanye West. Other releases in 2006 were Robin Thicke's second album, The Evolution of Robin Thicke, which featured the hit, "Lost Without U." The last 2006 release was Clipse's second album, Hell Hath No Fury, the album featured another hit for the label, "Mr. Me Too." This was their first release through their Re-Up Gang Records imprint. Because of constant delays on the album's release date, and a small amount of production, then low record sales, Clipse asked for their release from the Jive Records label with in terms released them from Star Trak Entertainment moving their Re-Up Gang Records imprint to Columbia Records. Star Trak Entertainment has since signed Teyana Taylor to their roster, along with Chester French, Natasha Ramos, Epoch When and Sergio Veneno. In 2007, Kenna released his album, Make Sure They See My Face. Releases for 2008 included N.E.R.D and Robin Thicke. Releases for 2009 included Chester French, Teyana Taylor, Kenna, Clipse and Teriyaki Boyz. In 2013, the label saw success once again with the chart-topping single "Blurred Lines", performed by Robin Thicke featuring Pharrell & T.I.

Artists

Former artists
 Chester French
 Clipse
 Fam-Lay
 The High Speed Scene
 Kelis
 Kenna
 N.E.R.D
 The Neptunes
 Super Cat
 Slim Thug
 Snoop Dogg
 Spymob
 Robin Thicke
 Teriyaki Boyz
 Teyana Taylor
 Pharrell Williams

Discography

References

Record labels established in 2002
American record labels
Contemporary R&B record labels
American hip hop record labels
Pop record labels
Labels distributed by Universal Music Group
The Neptunes